A Dictionary of English Etymology is an etymological dictionary of the English language written by Hensleigh Wedgwood and published by Trübner and Company in three volumes from 1859 to 1865 (vol. 1 1859, vol. 2 1862, vol. 3 1865), with a second edition published in 1871.

It was reviewed anonymously and by Herbert Coleridge.

The second volume was reviewed anonymously, by William Dwight Whitney, and by Eduard Müller and Henry Sweet.

References 

English dictionaries
1859 non-fiction books
1862 non-fiction books
1865 non-fiction books